Round Lake is a northern suburb of Chicago in Lake County, Illinois, United States. Per the 2020 census, the population was 18,721.

Geography 
Round Lake is located at  (42.354045, -88.100529), about 55 miles northwest of Chicago's Loop.

Highways
 
  Belvidere Road
  Big Hollow Road

Demographics

2020 census

Note: the US Census treats Hispanic/Latino as an ethnic category. This table excludes Latinos from the racial categories and assigns them to a separate category. Hispanics/Latinos can be of any race.

2000 Census
As of 2010 United States Census, there were 18,289 people, 6,206 households, and 5,847 families residing in the village. The population increased 310% from the 2000 US Census total of 5,492. The racial makeup of the village was 68.9% White, 10.77% African American, 0.5% Native American, 12.7% Asian, 0.07% Pacific Islander, 9.69% from other races, and 3.24% from two or more races. 35.3% of the population were Hispanic or Latino of any race.

There 6,206 total housing units, of which 94.2% or (5,847) were occupied households. Of these occupied households 48% had children under the age of 18 living with them. 49.5% of the population was male, 50.5% female. 80% of the occupied homes were owner-occupied with the remaining 19.5% in renter-occupied. The average household size was 3.13 per home.

In the village, the population was spread out, with 32.2% under the age of 18, 7% from 18 to 24, 43.5% from 25 to 49, 12.3% from 50 to 64, and 4.8% who were 65 years of age or older.

As of Census 2000, the median income for a household in the village was $58,051, and the median income for a family was $61,277. Males had a median income of $43,063 versus $31,336 for females. The per capita income for the village was $21,585. 6.8% of the population and 6.5% of families were below the poverty line. Out of the total population, 6.7% of those under the age of 18 and 7.9% of those 65 and older were living below the poverty line.

History

While the retreating Wisconsin glacier left an attractive environment for farmers who entered western Lake County after the Black Hawk War of 1832, the numerous lakes and wet prairies there prevented easy movement to agricultural markets. Farmers traded at stagecoach trail communities such as Hainesville, often exchanging dairy products and eggs for what they could not craft on the farm.

In the 1890s, when officials of the Chicago, Milwaukee & St. Paul Railroad extended a branch line from their Milwaukee–Chicago main line at Libertyville Junction (later Rondout) to Janesville, Wisconsin, western Lake County farmers gained easy access to Chicago.

Landowners near Hainesville such as Amarias M. White knew that a railroad station would increase property values. In a classic ploy, White offered the railroad free land in exchange for a station. He also drew up a town plat to show railroad officials that profitable traffic would come through his station site. White succeeded, and Round Lake, named after the nearby lake, not Hainesville, whose inhabitants failed to offer the railroad anything, became the area station on the "Milwaukee Road".

White's promise came true in 1901 when the Armour Company decided to harvest ice from Round Lake for their refrigerator car operations. They erected a massive ice storage building holding over 100,000 tons for shipment in spring and summer months.

In 1908 White and his partners acted to incorporate the station area. The proposed village population was too small to meet incorporation requirements, so area farmers were included in the village with the understanding that, once incorporation was successful, their farms would be disconnected. On January 7, 1909, Round Lake incorporated with White as village president. Soon after, those farmers who wished to disconnect were allowed to do so—an act which prevented present-day residents of the village from having any public access to their namesake lake.

A fire in 1917 destroyed the Armour operation in the village, although a dormitory housing winter ice cutters survived. Noticing vacation resorts which had sprung up around the lake, the Armour Company remodeled its dormitory into a rural summer retreat for company employees. The praise showered on the Round Lake environment by them helped bring a slow trickle of nonagricultural residential growth to the village.

With post–World War II expansion into the suburbs, Round Lake's Armour-era reputation as a rural refuge acted as a magnet for development. People began moving into the unincorporated area around the lake and demanding municipal services. The village of Round Lake failed to make those annexations. As a result, new communities, using the words "Round Lake" in their corporate titles, arose. This resulted in a duplication of political hierarchies and village services which still exists.

Since the 1970s, Round Lake has embarked on an expansive annexation program. With ongoing development of those areas, Round Lake was expected to continue to grow.

From 2000 to the present time, the village has doubled in population. It is expected to reach 20,000 residents by the year 2020.

Notable people 

 Clay Guida, UFC fighter; born in Round Lake

Education
Round Lake students attend schools in one of five different elementary and high school districts.

The Roman Catholic Archdiocese of Chicago operates Catholic schools. St. Joseph School is in Round Lake. The student population from circa 2016 to 2020 declined by 92. The archdiocese asked if there were interested benefactors, but the archdiocese was unsuccessful. Therefore the archdiocese decided to close the school after spring 2020.

References

External links

Village of Round Lake
Round Lake Chamber of Commerce & Industry

Villages in Illinois
Villages in Lake County, Illinois
Populated places established in 1908
1908 establishments in Illinois
Majority-minority cities and towns in Lake County, Illinois